The Somali Bantus (also known as Gosha, or Jareerweyne locally) are a Bantu origin ethnic minority group in Somalia who primarily reside in the southern part of the country, primarily near the Jubba and Shabelle rivers. The Somali Bantus are descendants of enslaved peoples from various Bantu ethnic groups from Southeast Africa, particularly from Mozambique, Malawi, and Tanzania. The East African slave trade was not eliminated until the early parts of the 20th century.

Somali Bantus are not ancestrally related to the indigenous ethnic Somalis of Cushitic background and have a culture distinct from the ethnic Somalis. The Somali Bantu have remained marginalized ever since the establishment of Somalia. Some Somali Bantu people have been displaced into Kenya, and a small number have returned to Tanzania. An overseas diaspora community of Somali Bantus can be found primarily in the United States.

There are many different Somali Bantu clans such as the Shambara, Shabelle, Shiidle, Makane, Ngindo, Makua and Zigua, which all contain clans and subclans. Assimilation into mainstream Somali society tends to be stronger for Somali Bantus living in urban areas and the Shebelle region, while Bantu linguistic and cultural traditions tend to be stronger in Somali Bantus of the Juba region. Politically, the Somali Bantu of different tribes form ethnic alliances in the parliament of Somalia.

The Somali Bantu are not to be confused with the members of Swahili society of Somalia in coastal centers, such as the Bajuni or the Bravanese, who speak dialects of the Swahili language but have a culture, tradition, and history separate of the Somali Bantu.

The number of Somali Bantu in Somalia is estimated to be around 900,000 persons and is mainly concentrated in the south, but they can be found in urban areas throughout the country.

Etymology

Various terms differentiating the Somali Bantu from ethnic Somalis have been in usage for a long time. However, the term "Somali Bantu" in specific is an ethnonym that was created by humanitarian agencies shortly after the outbreak of the civil war in Somalia in 1991. Its purpose was to help staff of these aid agencies better distinguish between, on the one hand, Bantu origin ethnic minority groups hailing from Southern Somalia and thus in dire need of humanitarian attention and on the other hand, versus other Bantu groups from elsewhere in Africa that did not require immediate humanitarian assistance. The neologism further spread through the media, which repeated verbatim what the aid agencies' increasingly began indicating in their reports as a new name for Somalia's ethnically Bantu minorities. Prior to the civil war, the Bantu were referred to in the literature as Bantu, Gosha, Mushunguli, Oggi and especially as Jareer, which they still, in fact, are within Somalia proper.

History

Origin

Between 2500–3000 years ago, speakers of the original proto-Bantu language group began a millennia-long series of migrations eastward from their original homeland in the general Nigeria and Cameroon area of West Africa. This Bantu expansion first introduced Bantu peoples to central, southern and southeastern Africa, regions where they had previously been absent from.

The Somali Bantu largely trace their origins from the Indian Ocean slave trade (sometimes also referred to as the Arab slave trade). This was a centuries long trade which brought Southeast African populations to Somalia and other parts of the Arab world. Marginalized Black African ethnic minorities with an ethnogenesis in slavery can be found in nearby countries such as the Al Akhdam ethnic minority in Yemen paralleling social dynamics in Somalia.

Alternative theories suggest that some Somali Bantu tribes migrated to the riverine parts of the southern Horn of Africa as agriculturalists taking part in the millennia long ongoing Bantu expansion. However, no reliable historical documentation exists directly linking the present-day Somali Bantu to the premodern civilizations of Somalia. Medieval travellers visiting Southern Somalia at the time described its inhabitants as being mostly ethnically similar to the inhabitants of Northern Somalia and made no ethnic distinctions besides noting the presence of Arab, Persian, and Indian traders.

The Mushunguli language is the sole surviving Somali Bantu language and is mutually intelligible with the Zigula language still spoken in Tanzania. Mushunguli's closest sister languages are Shambala, Bondei, and Ngulu which are languages originating from Tanzania and largely confined to it.

Slave trade

The Indian Ocean slave trade was multi-directional and changed over time. To meet the demand for menial labor, black Africans from southeastern Africa bought by Somali, Omani, Benadiri & Swahili slave traders & were sold in cumulatively large numbers over the centuries to customers in Morocco, Libya, Somalia, Egypt, Arabia, the Persian Gulf, India, the Far East and the Indian Ocean islands.

From 1800 to 1890, between 25,000–50,000 black African slaves are thought to have been sold from the slave market of Zanzibar to the Somali coast. Most of the slaves were taken from the Majindo, Makua, Nyasa, Yao, Zaramo and Zigua ethnic groups of Tanzania, Mozambique, and Malawi. Collectively, these Bantu groups are known as Mushunguli, which is a term taken from Mzigula, the Zigua tribe's word for "people" (the word holds multiple implied meanings including "worker", "foreigner", and "slave").

Bantu slaves were made to work in plantations owned by Somalis along the Shebelle and Jubba rivers, harvesting lucrative cash crops such as grain and cotton.

Colonialism and the end of slavery
Since the very end of the eighteen century, fugitive slaves from the Shebelle valley began to settle in the Jubba valley. By the late 1890s, when Italians and British occupied the Jubaland area, an estimated 35,000 former Bantu slaves were already settled there.

The Italian colonial administration abolished slavery in Somalia at the turn of the 20th century by decree of the King of Italy. Some Bantu groups, however, remained enslaved until the 1910s in the areas not totally dominated by the Italians, and continued to be despised and discriminated against by large parts of Somali society. After World War I, many Somali Bantus, mainly the descendants of former slaves, became Catholics. They were principally concentrated in the Villaggio Duca degli Abruzzi and Genale plantations.

Indeed, in 1895, the first 45 Bantu slaves were freed by the Italian colonial authorities under the administration of the chartered Catholic company Filonardi. The former were later converted to Catholicism. Massive emancipation and conversion of slaves in Somalia only began after the anti-slavery activist and explorer Luigi Robecchi Bricchetti informed the Italian public about the local slave trade and the indifferent attitude of the first Italian colonial government in Somalia toward it.

Contemporary situation

Profile

Bantus simply refer to themselves as Bantu. Those who can trace their origins to Bantu groups in southeast Africa refer to themselves collectively as Shanbara, Shangama or Wagosha. Those who trace their origins to Bantu tribes inhabiting areas further south call themselves Zigula, Makua, Yao, Nyassa, Ngindo, Nyamwezi, Mwera and other names, although the Somalis from Mogadishu called them with a discriminatory word all together Mushunguli.

Unlike Somalis, most of whom are traditionally nomadic herders, Bantus are mainly sedentary subsistence farmers. The Bantus' predominant "Negroid" physical traits also serve to further distinguish them from Somalis. Among these phenotypic characteristics of the Bantu are kinky (jareer) hair, while Somalis are soft-haired (jilec).

The majority of Bantus have converted to Islam, which they first began embracing. Starting in the colonial period, some also began converting to Christianity. However, whether Muslim or Christian, many Bantu have retained their ancestral animist traditions, including the practice of possession dances and the use of magic . Many of these religious traditions closely resemble those practised in Tanzania, similarities which also extend to hunting, harvesting and music, among other things.

Many Bantu have also retained their ancestral social structures, with their Bantu tribe of origin in southeastern Africa serving as the principal form of social stratification. Smaller units of societal organization are divided according to matrilineal kinship groups, the latter of which are often interchangeable with ceremonial dance groupings. Meanwhile, they do maintain some traditions of their own, such as the common act of basket weaving. Another important cultural aspect of the Bantu people consists art using bright colors and fabrics.

Primarily for security reasons, some Bantus have attempted to attach themselves to groups within the Somalis' indigenous patrilineal clan system of social stratification. These Bantus are referred to by the Somalis as sheegato or sheegad (literally "pretenders"), meaning they are not ethnically Somali and are attached to a Somali group on an adoptive, client basis. Bantus that have retained their ancestral southeast African traditions have likewise been known to level sarcasm at other Bantus who have tried to associate themselves with their Somali patrons, albeit without any real animosity (the civil war has actually served to strengthen relationships between the various Bantu sub-groups).

All told, there has been very little co-mingling between Bantus and Somalis. Formal intermarriage is extremely rare, and typically results in ostracism the few times it does occur.

Post-1991
During the Somali Civil War, many Bantu were forced from their lands in the lower Juba River valley, as militiamen from various Somali clans took control of the area. Being visible minorities and possessing little in the way of firearms, the Bantu were particularly vulnerable to violence and looting by gun-toting militiamen.

To escape war and famine, tens of thousands of Bantus fled to refugee camps like Dadaab in neighboring Kenya, with most vowing never to return to Somalia. In 1991, 12,000 Bantu people were displaced into Kenya, and nearly 3,300 were estimated to have returned to Tanzania. In 2002, the International Organization for Migration (IOM) moved a large number of Bantu refugees 1500 km to Kakuma in northwest Kenya because it was safer to process them for resettlement farther away from the Somali border.

Resettlement in the United States

In 1999, the United States classified the Bantu refugees from Somalia as a priority and the United States Department of State first began what has been described as the most ambitious resettlement plan ever from Africa, with thousands of Bantus scheduled for resettlement in America. In 2003, the first Bantu immigrants began to arrive in U.S. cities, and by 2007, around 13,000 had been resettled to cities throughout the United States with the help of the United Nations High Commissioner for Refugees (UNHCR), the U.S. State Department, and refugee resettlement agencies across the country.

Among the resettlement destinations, it is known that Salt Lake City, Utah received about 1,000 Bantus. Other cities in the southwest such as Denver, Colorado, San Antonio, Texas, and Tucson, Arizona have received a few thousand as well. In New England, Manchester, New Hampshire and Burlington, Vermont were also destinations selected for resettlement of several hundred. The documentary film Rain in a Dry Land chronicles this journey, with stories of Bantu refugees resettled in Springfield, Massachusetts and Atlanta, Georgia. Plans to resettle the Bantu in smaller towns, such as Holyoke, Massachusetts and Cayce, South Carolina, were scrapped after local protests. There are also communities of several hundred to a thousand Bantu people in cities that also have high concentrations of ethnic Somalis such as the Minneapolis-St. Paul area, Columbus, Ohio, Atlanta, San Diego, Boston, Pittsburgh, and Seattle, with a notable presence of about 1,000 Bantus in Lewiston, Maine. Making Refuge follows Somali Bantus' strenuous journey towards eventual resettlement in Lewiston and details several families' stories of relocating there.

Upon their resettlement in Lewiston, however, Bantus were met with a great amount of hostility from local Lewiston residents. In 2002, former Mayor Laurier Raymond wrote an open letter to Somali Bantu residents in an effort to dissuade them from further relocation to Lewiston. He proclaimed their resettlement to the town had become a "burden" on the community and predicted an overall negative impact on the town's social services and resources. In 2003, members of a white supremacist group demonstrated in support of the mayor's letter, which prompted a counter-demonstration of about 4,000 people at Bates College, as chronicled in documentary film The Letter. Despite such adversity, the Somali Bantu community in central Maine has continued to flourish and integrate in years since.

Return to ancestral home
Prior to the United States' agreement to accommodate Bantu refugees from Somalia, attempts were made to resettle the refugees to their ancestral homes in southeastern Africa. Before the prospect of emigrating to America was raised, this was actually the preference of the Bantus themselves. In fact, many Bantus voluntarily left the UN camps where they were staying, to seek refuge in Tanzania. Such a return to their ancestral homeland represented the fulfillment of a two-century old dream.

While Tanzania was initially willing to grant the Bantus asylum, the UNCHR did not provide any financial or logistical guarantees to support the resettlement and integration of the refugees into Tanzania. The Tanzanian authorities also experienced additional pressure when refugees from neighbouring Rwanda began pushing into the western part of the country, forcing them to retract their offer to accommodate the Bantus. On the other hand, the Bantus who spoke kizigula had already started arriving in Tanzania since before the war due to discrimination experienced in Somalia.

Mozambique, the other ancestral home of the Bantu, then emerged as an alternative point of resettlement. However, as it became clear that the United States was prepared to accommodate the Bantu refugees, the Mozambican government soon backed out on its promises, citing a lack of resources and potential political instability in the region where the Bantu might have been resettled.

By the late 2000s, the situation in Tanzania had improved, and the Tanzanian government began granting Bantus citizenship and allocating them land in areas of Tanzania where their ancestors are known to have been taken from as slaves.

See also
History of Somali Bantus in Maine
Indian Ocean slave trade
Bantu peoples

References

External links
General:
UNHCR Publication Refugees about the Somali Bantu
The Somali Bantu: Their History and Culture
Differences That Matter: The Struggle of the Marginalised in Somalia

In the U.S.:
The Somali Bantu Experience
Refugees USA
Somali Bantus Arrive In Salt Lake City
Somali Bantu Community – Development Council of Denver

 
Somali clans